Bollons' rattail, Coelorinchus bollonsi, is a species of rattail found along the east coast of New Zealand at depths of between 300 and 800 m.  Its length is between 10 and 25 cm.

References
 
 
 Tony Ayling & Geoffrey Cox, Collins Guide to the Sea Fishes of New Zealand,  (William Collins Publishers Ltd, Auckland, New Zealand 1982) 

Macrouridae
Endemic marine fish of New Zealand
Fish described in 1980